The Big Pig Gig and Big Pig Gig: Do-Re-Wee were public art exhibits on display in Cincinnati, Ohio, United States, in the summers of 2000 and 2012, respectively. Local artists and schools decorated hundreds of full-sized fiberglass pig statues and installed them throughout the downtown area. The events were organized by ArtWorks, a community art employment program.

Background
The Big Pig Gig had several origin sources. perhaps one of many projects inspired by CowParade, which had been featured in Chicago the previous year, but also the work of an anonymous behind the scenes activist who never heard of Cowparade. The public version of the story has Laura Pulfer, a columnist at The Cincinnati Enquirer, wrote about seven-year-old Alexander Longi's proposal to Mayor Roxanne Qualls for an event similar to the one in Chicago. The idea to build statues of pigs recalled Cincinnati's annual Flying Pig Marathon and the city's nickname of "Porkopolis". The nickname dates from the mid–19th century, when the Cincinnati meat packing industry led the country. The project's rhyming name was submitted by Joyce Monger and won a naming contest.

With the support of ArtWorks and various local businesses and media outlets, the project attracted 425 entries, many of which depicted "flying pigs". Hundreds of pigs were installed downtown, while others were stationed across the Ohio River in Newport and Covington, Kentucky. They stretched north to Findlay Market, east to Eden Park, south to the Covington Cathedral, and west to Union Terminal. Participants included over 50 schools. More than 500,000 visitors brought an estimated $170 million to the city. The exhibit officially began May 14 and ended October 31.

A number of these statues have been sold on eBay for charity since the event, and many others have come to decorate the Cincinnati airport, local hotels, and other buildings. The following year saw a similar though less publicized event in which large flower pots were decorated and placed throughout downtown.

Big Pig Gig: Do-Re-Wee
ArtWorks organized a smaller exhibit, which went on display from June to September 2012, to coincide with the World Choir Games. One hundred fiberglass pigs – including a pair joined by a replica Roebling Suspension Bridge – were stationed downtown and in Over-the-Rhine.

See also
CowParade
Flying Pig Marathon
Pigs in the City, another public art exhibit featuring pigs

References

External links
 Websites about the 2000 event:
 
 
 
 Websites about the 2012 event:
 

Festivals in Cincinnati
2000 in the United States
2000 sculptures
Arts in Cincinnati
Outdoor sculptures in Cincinnati
Cultural festivals in the United States
Fictional pigs
Painted statue public art
2000 in Ohio
Pigs in art